Andronovo is a rural locality (a village) in Chernushinsky District, Perm Krai, Russia. The population was 119 as of 2010. There are 3 streets.

Geography 
Andronovo is located 19 km northwest of Chernushka (the district's administrative centre) by road. Bedryazh is the nearest rural locality.

References 

Rural localities in Chernushinsky District